Kpini Chugu, which means Guineafowl Festival in Dagbani, is a minor festival celebrated on the fourth month after Damba  in Northern region of Ghana. It is observed in the Dagbon, Mamprugu and Nanung traditional areas. Naa Zangina is known to have been the initiator of this festival.

References 

Festivals in Ghana